Thomas Foster "Jack" Raine (18 May 1897 – 30 May 1979) was an English stage, television and film actor.

He was a leading man of the British cinema in the late twenties and early thirties in such films as The Hate Ship (1929), Raise the Roof, Suspense, Night Birds and The Middle Watch (all 1930), before moving down the cast list and becoming a character actor. Throughout the thirties and forties he appeared in numerous supporting roles, usually as sturdy figures of authority, including The Ghoul (1933), The Clairvoyant (1934), Holiday Camp, Mine Own Executioner (both 1947) and Easy Money (1948). He also played Sir Graham Forbes in the first two Paul Temple films Send for Paul Temple (1946) and Calling Paul Temple (1948). One of his last British films was a rare co-starring role of this era in the 'B' movie No Way Back (1949), opposite Terence De Marney, in which he played against type as a small time gangster.

Like a lot of British actors during the fifties he made the move to Hollywood and enjoyed a career of character roles which continued into the seventies. These included Julius Caesar (1953), An Affair to Remember (1957), Witness for the Prosecution (both 1957), My Fair Lady (1964), Doctor Doolittle (1967), The Killing of Sister George (1968) and Bedknobs and Broomsticks (1971).

Numerous television roles included Father Knows Best (Tv Series) Perry Mason, Mister Ed, 77 Sunset Strip, The Outer Limits, The Twilight Zone, The Man from U.N.C.L.E. and Ironside. He also portrayed Dr. Watson opposite Basil Rathbone's Sherlock Holmes on Broadway, after the passing of Rathbone's screen Watson, Nigel Bruce.

He was married to musical theatre actress Binnie Hale from 1924 until their divorce in 1934. He was subsequently married to Sonia Phyllis Bellamy and then Theodora Moreau Wilson.

Selected filmography

 Piccadilly (1929) – Diner in Nightclub Scene (uncredited)
 The Hate Ship (1929) – Roger Peel
 Raise the Roof (1930) – Atherley Armitage
 Harmony Heaven (1930) – Stuart
 Suspense (1930) – Capt. Wilson
 Night Birds (1930) – Sgt. Harry Cross
 The Middle Watch (1930) – Cmdr. Baddeley
 Comets (1930) – Himself
 Fires of Fate (1932) – Filbert Frayne
 Her Night Out (1932) – Jim Hanley
 The Ghoul (1933) – Davis, the chauffeur (uncredited)
 Two Wives for Henry (1933) – Hugo Horsfal
 The House of Trent (1933) – Peter
 The Fortunate Fool (1933) – Gerald (credited as Jack Raines)
 Out of the Past (1933) – Eric Cotton
 Important People (1934) – George Pelling
 Love, Life and Laughter (1934) – Aide (uncredited)
 Dangerous Ground (1934) – Philip Tarry
 Red Ensign (1934) – Testing Official (uncredited)
 Little Friend (1934) – Jeffries
 Lilies of the Field (1934) – George Belwood
 Mimi (1935) – Duke
 Royal Cavalcade (1935) – Minor Role (uncredited)
 The Clairvoyant (1935) – Customs Officer (uncredited)
 Double or Quits (1938) – Roland
 Meet Mr. Penny (1938) – Preston
 Life of St. Paul (1938) – Pudens
 For Freedom (1940) – Cutter
 Girl in the News (1940) – Detective Smith (uncredited)
 Neutral Port (1940) – Alf
 Sailors Don't Care (1940) – Hotel Manager (uncredited)
 I Didn't Do It (1945) – J.B. Cato
 Send for Paul Temple (1946) – Sir Graham Forbes
 Just William's Luck (1947) – Detective No. 1
 Holiday Camp (1947) – District Superintendent (uncredited)
 Mine Own Executioner (1947) – Inspector Pierce
 Easy Money (1948) – Managing Director
 Just William's Luck (1948) – Police Sergeant
 Good-Time Girl (1948) – Detective Inspector Girton
 Calling Paul Temple (1948) – Sir Graham Forbes
 My Brother's Keeper (1948) – Chief Constable
 The Story of Shirley Yorke (1948) – Stansfield Yorke
 Quartet (1948) – Thomas (segment "The Facts of Life")
 No Way Back (1949) – Joe Sleat
 Holiday for Sinners (1952) – Dr. Surtees
 Les Misérables (1952) – Captain (uncredited)
 The Happy Time (1952) – Mr. Frye – School Principal
 Botany Bay (1952) – Governor's Aide (uncredited)
 Above and Beyond (1952) – Dr. Fiske
 Rogue's March (1953) – Gen. Woodbury
 The Story of Three Loves (1953) – Doctor (segment "The Jealous Lover") (uncredited)
 The Desert Rats (1953) – C.I.C. (uncredited)
 Julius Caesar (1953) – Trebonius
 Young Bess (1953) – Governor of Tower (uncredited)
 Dangerous When Wet (1953) – Stuart Frye
 Rhapsody (1954) – Edmund Streller
 Elephant Walk (1954) – Norbert (uncredited)
 Bengal Brigade (1954) – Col. Rivers (uncredited)
 The Silver Chalice (1954) – Magistrate (uncredited)
 Prince of Players (1955) – Theatre Manager (uncredited)
 Interrupted Melody (1955) – Mr. Norson (uncredited)
 Soldier of Fortune (1955) – Maj. Leith Phipps (uncredited)
 Moonfleet (1955) – Frame (uncredited)
 Not as a Stranger (1955) – Dr. Lettering
 How to Be Very, Very Popular (1955) – Speaker (uncredited)
 The Girl in the Red Velvet Swing (1955) – Mr. Finley (uncredited)
 D-Day the Sixth of June (1956) – Officer (uncredited)
 The Power and the Prize (1956) – Mr. Pitt-Semphill
 An Affair to Remember (1957) – British TV Commentator (uncredited)
 Witness for the Prosecution (1957) – Sir Wilfrid's doctor (uncredited)
 Compulsion (1959) – Professor McKinnon (uncredited)
 Woman Obsessed (1959) – Ian Campbell (uncredited)
 Taras Bulba (1962) – Mayor (uncredited)
 My Fair Lady (1964) – Extra (uncredited)
 The Americanization of Emily (1964) – Hotel Waiter (uncredited)
 Do Not Disturb (1965) – Bird Watcher (uncredited)
 Our Man Flint (1966) – English Diplomat (uncredited)
 Assault on a Queen (1966) – Bartender (uncredited)
 Doctor Dolittle (1967) – Vicar (uncredited)
 The Killing of Sister George (1968) – Deputy Commissioner
 Hello, Dolly! (1969) – Elderly Man (uncredited)
 Scandalous John (1971) – Switchman
 Bedknobs and Broomsticks (1971) – Old Home Guardsman (uncredited) (final film role)

References

External links
 
 

1897 births
1979 deaths
English male stage actors
English male film actors
English male television actors
Male actors from London
20th-century English male actors
British expatriate male actors in the United States